Panmela Castro (Rio de Janeiro, 26 June 1981) is a Brazilian artist and activist. Her art work addresses, in a confessional way, the relations established with her life experience and questions about the other's body in dialogue with her own, among others related to alterity such as feminist cultural criticism. The artist has her work recognized nationally and internationally, and her works are part of several collections around the world. She is considered by O Globo as one of the most prominent artists in Brazilian contemporary art.

Biography

Panmela was born and raised in the neighborhood of Penha, a suburb of Rio de Janeiro. Bachelor in Painting from the School of Fine Arts of the Federal University of Rio de Janeiro and Master in Contemporary Artistic Processes from the Institute of Arts of the State University of Rio de Janeiro, her art is influenced by issues related to corporeality and the dialogue with the city.

Panmela, who calls herself a mixed-race woman in Brazil, was raised as a white girl by her conservative lower-middle-class family in Penha, Rio de Janeiro.

Her mother, Mrs. Elizabeth, faced a series of financial difficulties and experienced some episodes of domestic violence with her first husband, until she decided to run away and married to another man, who provided her a more dignified life and raised Panmela as a daughter. Although, when she turned 15, her new father has declared bankruptcy. It was at this age that the artist, still very young, had to work to help with household expenses.

First Steps
 

In a destabilized family environment, Panmela abandoned her parents' house and decided to live in Manguinhos, known as one of the most dangerous favelas in the city. To guarantee the expenses of her new reality, she started to draw people on the street, and charged the portrayed people one real per drawing.

Adopting the pseudonym Anarkia Boladona, when participating in the carioca graffiti movement – ​​then composed mostly of men, being Panmela the first girl of her generation to climb buildings to spray her label, in addition to having made illegal interventions throughout the city . From then on, she began to dedicate herself to the first graffiti artists and was one of the first graffiti artists to paint trains in the city of Rio.

In 2005, Panmela was beaten and kept in unlawful confinement, and from then on the painting was kept on the murals, where she could express the traumatic experience of domestic violence. She came to understand the graffiti as a form of denunciation. This story reverberates to this day in her canvases and performances.

Performance

In parallel with graffiti, the artist (who has already adopted her civil name as an artistic name) began, in her works, to provoke and polemicize with the street and with the established truths of patriarchy, especially in relation to the female body, sexuality and subjectivity, analyzing power relations. She revoked a restriction creation of her artistic production, understanding art as her own way of life. In this way, her personal experiences, along with her intimate attitudes, choices for unconventional paths, and dialogue with the street would be for her the most important process, the work itself.

Her first public performance, on July 7, 2015, took place at Eva opening exhibition. In 2016, she presented her two sequential performances: Why? at the Museu Bispo do Rosário Arte Contemporânea, where she walked with a huge pink dress and scratched across her chest with a razor the word Why?, and Imitação da Rosa, where she invited the public to walk through The Republic Museum in a Siamese dress.

Paintings
After a long period in graffiti and performance, Panmela Castro revisits her childhood and youth memories, recovers her academic training, and returns to producing a series of paintings in which she exposes her desires and dilemmas as an artist who, despite being internationally known and no longer living in precarious conditions, needs to deal with the frailties of life, especially those evoked by the past. In her current paintings, Panmela addresses issues from her daily life, as seen in the series Purge, memories, as presented in the series Missing Home and even issues of neglect, acceptance and structural racism, as intimately exposed in the series Women of Color Don't Receive Flowers.

Cultural impact and accomplishments
In March 2010 Panmela Castro was awarded The DVF Award for being an extraordinary women fighting for change for women's rights.

In 2013, she was listed as one of the World Economic Forum's Young Global Leaders.

Panmela Castro has also been nominated as one of the 150 women that have shaken the world by Newsweek and The Daily Beast. Castro has been acknowledged worldwide through her efforts to advocate women's rights.

She formed Rede Nami, an urban network where female urban artist raises awareness on gender inequality through public art, graffiti, and workshops in Rio. Rede Nami also provides workshops in Brazil for women and girls, teaching them about domestic violence and teaching them about graffiti art.

Today, Panmela promotes its mission in different parts of the world by sharing its vision through lectures, exhibitions and workshops, at festivals, forums and conferences - from the United Nations, the Organization of American States, the Rosa Luxemburg Foundation, the Ayara Family, Manifesto Festival, FASE and Caramundo. In addition to producing murals and exhibiting in several countries, she has received numerous awards and recognitions, including the Hutúz Award for graffiti artist of the decade in 2009 and the Vital Voices Global Leadership Awards in the human rights category, thus joining the group of honorees such as Chilean President Michelle Bachelet, women's anti-trafficking pioneer Somaly Mam, Nobel laureate Laureate Muhammad Yunus, and US Secretary Hillary Clinton. In 2012 she was honored by the Diller Von Furstenberg Family Foundation with the DVF Awards of the famous fashion designer Diane von Fürstenberg along with other women such as Oprah Winfrey, she entered the list of Newsweek Magazine as one of the 150 women who are "shaking" in the world and in 2017 was named in W Magazine list of 18 names of new generation activists who are making a difference.

References

External links

 

1981 births
Living people
Artists from Rio de Janeiro (city)
Brazilian graffiti artists
Brazilian contemporary artists
Feminist artists
Guerilla artists
Political artists
Street artists
Women in Brazil
Women's rights in the Americas